The Hansa-Brandenburg L.16, was an experimental triplane fighter that was designed in the Austro-Hungarian Empire during the First World War.

Specifications (Hansa-Brandenburg L.16)

References

Further reading

External links

World War One Aviation: Austrian Experimental Aircraft

L.16
1910s Austro-Hungarian fighter aircraft
Aircraft first flown in 1917